Dieter Müller (né Kaster; 1 April 1954) is a German former professional footballer who played as a forward. He achieved his greatest success playing for 1. FC Köln in the Bundesliga in the late 1970s. Müller scored 177 goals in 303 games in the German league, including six goals in one game in August 1977, a record that still stands. He also played 12 times for West Germany from 1976 to 1978, scoring nine goals.

Career
Müller played and scored in the UEFA Euro 1976 final, which West Germany lost on penalties to Czechoslovakia. He was again in the national team in the 1978 FIFA World Cup, though the campaign ended in disappointment when West Germany, the defending champions, did not qualify for the tournament's final. In his spell with 1. FC Köln he set a record for the most goals scored by a player in a single Bundesliga match. On 17 August 1977, he tallied six goals (scoring in the 12th, 23rd, 32nd, 52nd, 73rd and in the 85th minute) in Köln's 7–2 victory over Werder Bremen in front of a crowd of 19,000 at Köln's Müngersdorfer Stadion. However, since television cameramen were on strike on that day, there are no known film of Müller's goals. He was crowned Bundesliga topscorer that season (24 goals in 33 games), as he had the season before (34 goals in 34 appearances).

After he left Köln, he played for several seasons in France and Switzerland, before returning to West Germany.

Müller is the son of Heinz Kaster, who played as a defender for FC St. Pauli and Kickers Offenbach in the early 1950s. The striker had already been a schoolboy international, when his stepfather's adoption turned his surname into Müller.

Personal life
Müller's son Alexander, aged 16, died of a brain tumor in 1997.

Müller suffered a severe heart attack on 5 October 2012 and fell into a five-day coma.

Career statistics

Club

Honours
1. FC Köln
 Bundesliga: 1977-78
 DFB Pokal: 1976–77, 1977–78

Bordeaux
 French Division 1: 1984–85

Individual
 Bundesliga top scorer: 1976–77, 1977–78
 DFB-Pokal top scorer: 1976–77, 1977–78
 UEFA European Championship top scorer: 1976
 UEFA European Championship Team of the Tournament: 1976

References

External links
 
 
 

1954 births
Living people
West German footballers
German footballers
Association football forwards
Germany international footballers
Germany B international footballers
UEFA Euro 1976 players
1978 FIFA World Cup players
Bundesliga players
2. Bundesliga players
Ligue 1 players
Swiss Super League players
Kickers Offenbach players
1. FC Köln players
VfB Stuttgart players
FC Girondins de Bordeaux players
Grasshopper Club Zürich players
1. FC Saarbrücken players
German football chairmen and investors
Sportspeople from Offenbach am Main
Footballers from Hesse
West German expatriate footballers
West German expatriate sportspeople in Switzerland
Expatriate footballers in Switzerland
West German expatriate sportspeople in France
Expatriate footballers in France